Caio Matias Marques (born 14 May 1994), commonly known as Caio Matias, Matias Caio or simply Caio, is a Brazilian footballer who currently plays as a midfielder for Aittitos Spata.

Career statistics

Club

Notes

References

1994 births
Living people
Brazilian footballers
Brazilian expatriate footballers
Association football midfielders
Football League (Greece) players
Clube Atlético do Porto players
Clube Náutico Capibaribe players
Brazilian expatriate sportspeople in Greece
Expatriate footballers in Greece